The Panther 57 Fast Patrol Boat is an evolution of the Lambro 57 coastal patrol boat, built by MotoMarine, a Greek company formerly known as Lambro boats.

This particular model, and its predecessors, have been among the key types employed by the Hellenic Coast Guard.

References

Patrol vessels of the Hellenic Coast Guard
Patrol vessels of Greece